Gideon Johnson Pillow (June 8, 1806 – October 8, 1878) was an American lawyer, politician, speculator, slaveowner, United States Army major general of volunteers during the Mexican–American War and Confederate brigadier general in the American Civil War.

Before his military career, Pillow practiced law and was active in Democratic Party politics. He was a floor leader in support of the nomination of fellow-Tennessean James K. Polk at the 1844 Democratic National Convention. In 1847, Pillow was commissioned a brigadier general of volunteers to serve in the Mexican–American War, and was later promoted to major general. He performed reasonably well, and was wounded that year at Cerro Gordo and Chapultepec.  However, controversy arose when, in a series of letters, Pillow tried to take what was perceived by some as undue credit for American victories at the expense of his commander, Major General Winfield Scott.  Pillow was court-martialed for insubordination, but with President Polk's assistance, the court-martial was reduced to a court of inquiry, which in 1848 exonerated Pillow.

After the war, Pillow served as a delegate to the Nashville Convention of 1850, where he supported compromise. He remained active in supporting the Democratic Party.  At the start of the Civil War in 1861, Pillow supported secession, and was commissioned a brigadier general in the Confederate Army in July. Pillow received the thanks of the Confederate Congress for driving off the Union force at the Battle of Belmont, Missouri.

Pillow controversially failed to exploit a temporary breakthrough of Union lines by his troops which might have allowed the Confederate garrison of Fort Donelson to escape at the Battle of Fort Donelson on February 15, 1862. The next night, before the surrender of the fort, Brigadier General John B. Floyd passed overall command of the fort to Pillow, who in turn passed it to Brigadier General Simon Buckner.  Floyd and Pillow managed to personally escape with a few aides before Buckner surrendered the remaining garrison to the Union Army of Brigadier General Ulysses S. Grant. These actions sent his military career and reputation into decline.

Pillow commanded a brigade at the Battle of Stones River in 1863, where he performed poorly, and was among the few generals in the army to praise the leadership of commanding General Braxton Bragg.  Removed from combat duty, he worked mainly in recruiting assignments through the remainder of the war. Bankrupt after the war, Pillow recovered financially and resumed a successful legal career. He died near Helena, Arkansas in 1878; initially buried in Helena, Pillow was later reinterred at Elmwood Cemetery in Memphis.

Early life
Pillow was born on June 8, 1806 in Williamson County, Tennessee, to Gideon Pillow and Ann Payne Pillow.

He came from a well connected, property owning family with a reputation for Indian fighting and loyalty to Andrew Jackson. He graduated from the University of Nashville in 1827 and practiced law in Columbia, Tennessee, where he became friends with future President James K. Polk. Pillow married Mary Elizabeth Martin, March 24, 1831.

In 1831, Tennessee Governor William Carroll appointed Pillow as district attorney general. Pillow served as a brigadier general in the Tennessee Militia from 1833 to 1836. Pillow played "an important role" in the 1844 Democratic Party convention which nominated Polk for president, although Pillow exaggerated his contribution to the exclusion of other prominent Polk supporters.

Mexican–American War

During the Mexican–American War, Pillow was appointed brigadier general of  United States Volunteers by President Polk as a brigadier general July 1, 1846. He was promoted to major general of volunteers on April 13, 1847. He was wounded in the right arm at the Battle of Cerro Gordo and in the left leg at Chapultepec.

During the war he came into conflict with one of the principal commanders of the American forces in Mexico, Major General Winfield Scott. The quarrel began when Scott asked Pillow to revise his exaggerated battle reports in which Pillow took credit for the American victories at the Battles of Contreras and Churubusco, but Pillow refused.

Although Pillow had performed reasonably well despite some mistakes in troop dispositions, the battles were still won by troops under the overall command of Scott.

Then, an anonymous letter—actually written by Pillow—published in the New Orleans Delta on September 10, 1847, and signed "Leonidas", wrongfully credited Pillow with the victories at Contreras, including the plan of battle and command of all the forces engaged, and Churubusco.

When Pillow's intrigue was exposed, he was arrested by Scott and held for court-martial for insubordination and violating regulations, along with Colonel James Duncan and Brigadier General William J. Worth.

Pillow wrote to President Polk about Scott's involvement in a bribery scheme proposed by Mexican leader Antonio López de Santa Anna for his help in ending the war without further bloodshed. Polk relieved Scott of command by a letter of February 18, 1848.

Polk reduced the proceedings against Pillow, Duncan and Worth from a court martial to a court of inquiry which had no criminal implications and added that Pillow could question Scott about the bribery scheme. Polk and Secretary of War William L. Marcy chose the three members of the court for their hostility to Scott.

During the court of inquiry that began in March 1848 in Mexico City, Major Archibald W. Burns, a paymaster and Pillow protege, claimed authorship of the "Leonidas" letter, at Pillow's behest. When the court of inquiry took as much testimony as they could in Mexico City, on April 21, 1848 they adjourned to reconvene in Frederick, Maryland. Scott left Mexico City the next day. The court reconvened on June 5, 1848, with Scott ill. Scott dropped the charges against Worth and Duncan and Pillow was exonerated when the court announced their findings on July 1, 1848. Scott resumed his duties as general-in-chief of the army early that month.

Pillow was discharged from the United States Volunteers on July 20, 1848. In early 1849, two other courts of inquiry cleared Pillow of any misconduct during the war. Pillow assisted Roswell S. Ripley in writing The war with Mexico.

In his memoirs, Scott wrote that Pillow was "amiable and possessed of some acuteness, but the only person I have ever known who was wholly indifferent in the choice between truth and falsehood, honesty and dishonesty:—ever as ready to attain an end by the one as the other, and habitually boastful of acts of cleverness at the total sacrifice of moral character."

On the other hand, Pillow's friend and patron, President Polk, stated after the court of inquiry was closed: "General Pillow is a gallant and highly meritorious officer, and has been greatly persecuted by General Scott, for no other reason than that he is a Democrat in his politics and was supposed to be my personal and political friend."

Post-war life
Pillow was a Tennessee delegate to the 1850 Nashville Convention, which met to consider possible courses of action if the federal government decided to ban slavery in territories acquired and organized as part of Westward Expansion and the Mexican–American War. Pillow supported compromise, opposing delegates who favored nullification and secession.

Pillow's antagonism for Scott was reflected in the 1852 election for president, when he opposed Scott and supported Franklin Pierce. Pillow attempted to win the vice presidential nomination, which went to William R. King. He intended to be a candidate for vice president in 1856, but supported his brother-in-law Aaron V. Brown, who lost the nomination to John C. Breckinridge. In 1857, Pillow tried unsuccessfully to secure the Democratic nomination for a seat in the United States Senate.

Pillow supported the candidacy of Stephen A. Douglas in the presidential election of 1860. With the election of Abraham Lincoln as president, Pillow ultimately supported secession as the will of the majority in Tennessee.

In addition to his law practice and management of the family farm, Pillow engaged in highly profitable land speculation. By 1860, he was one of the largest landholders in the South and possibly the wealthiest man in Tennessee.

Civil War

Early commands
Pillow joined the Confederacy just after the start of the Civil War. Tennessee Governor Isham G. Harris appointed Pillow as the senior major general in the Tennessee Militia and commander of the Provisional Army of Tennessee as of May 9, 1861.

Pillow worked closely with Harris to develop a regional munitions industry and to create the structure that would become the Army of Tennessee.

In July 1861, Pillow was appointed brigadier general in the Confederate States Army and was given command of the unit that was briefly called the "Army of Liberation". Pillow soon came under the command of Major General Leonidas Polk and General Albert Sidney Johnston in the Western Theater.

Polk ordered Pillow to lead a force into Kentucky on September 3, 1861, violating Kentucky's declared "neutrality" and provoking the State and the majority of its citizens to adhere to the Union.

Battle of Belmont
Pillow's first combat was against Union Army Brigadier General Ulysses S. Grant, also in his first battle, at Belmont, Missouri, in November. Grant crossed the Mississippi River from Cairo, Illinois on the night of November 6, 1861 to demonstrate against Confederate forces in Missouri to keep them occupied while Major General John C. Fremont tried to maintain control of the western part of the State.

Grant decided to attack the small Confederate Camp Johnston at Belmont, Missouri across the river from the Confederate fort at Columbus, Kentucky. Pillow, who had left the area with 5,000 men for Clarksville, Tennessee a few hours earlier, was recalled by Polk to confront the attackers.

Pillow ordered an assault on the Union force through the woods, giving the Union troops cover from which to push back the Confederates. Then the Union troops turned to the camp to pillage and celebrate, which Grant attempted to stop by burning the camp. Pillow, assisted by Brigadier General Benjamin F. Cheatham, reorganized the Confederates and counterattacked.

The disorganized Union soldiers fled for their gunboats, leaving the 27th Illinois Volunteer Infantry Regiment behind, only to be rescued by boats sent back for that purpose.

The battle is considered a Confederate victory because the Union force withdrew across the river under fire, although it was primarily inconclusive with the Confederate force of about 5,000 men and the Union force of about 3,100 men suffering about the same number of casualties and the armies returning to their original positions.

Nevertheless, Pillow and his command were voted the Thanks of the Confederate Congress on December 6, 1861:

Battle of Fort Donelson

Pillow resigned from the Army on December 28, 1861 in a dispute with Major General Leonidas Polk, but he soon realized that this was a rash decision and was able to cancel his resignation by obtaining an order from Confederate President Jefferson Davis on February 2, 1862. When he returned, under direct command of General Albert Sidney Johnston rather than under Polk, he was given command at Clarksville, Tennessee. Without permission, Pillow began to forward men and supplies to Fort Donelson, a crucial installation protecting the Cumberland River. On February 9, Pillow was briefly assigned to command at Fort Donelson and began to make improvements. Three additional brigadier generals were assigned to the fort soon thereafter. One, John B. Floyd, former governor of Virginia and Secretary of War under James Buchanan, outranked Pillow, who found himself displaced as commander and put in the unofficial position of second-in-command.

On February 12, 1862, Union forces under the command of Brigadier General Grant began to arrive near Fort Donelson. On the night of February 14, Floyd and his subordinate commanders decided to try to break out of the fort and escape a likely Union siege before the full Union force could arrive. Pillow set forth a plan to surprise the Union force which was accepted. Floyd gave no orders concerning the details of the operations, including the evacuation and order of march, in order to exploit any breakthrough.

As the Battle of Fort Donelson continued into February 15, 1862, under Floyd's order, Pillow took control from the general who was in formal command of the left wing of the army, Brigadier General Bushrod Johnson, who continued to ably assist Pillow. Pillow led this wing in a surprise assault with the intention of opening an escape route to relieve the besieged Confederate forces in the fort. Although the assault against the division of Brigadier General John A. McClernand was initially successful, Pillow inexplicably decided to pull his men from their advance positions and back into the trenches so that they could be resupplied before their escape, squandering the advances they had fought for so hard that morning. Floyd and the other generals were furious with Pillow, but it was too late to correct his error, especially because Floyd and Pillow saw Union troop movements and heard false reports about the arrival of substantial Union Army reinforcements. Floyd then panicked and ordered all troops back to their trenches. The Union force then retook the lost ground and the outer defenses of the fort.

At a council of war early on the morning of February 16, the generals agreed to surrender their army. Floyd, who feared prosecution for treason if he should be captured, turned command of the army over to Pillow, who had similar concerns and immediately passed command to Simon Bolivar Buckner, who had argued that the Confederate position was untenable. Believing the garrison could hold out long enough to be evacuated by river transport, Pillow still wanted to fight. He finally agreed with the other generals to surrender the fort and garrison, but not himself personally. Pillow did ask cavalry commander Nathan Bedford Forrest, who was determined to escape with his command, to lead Pillow's brigade out as well. Pillow escaped in the night in a small boat across the Cumberland River; Floyd likewise escaped, taking two regiments of his Virginia command with him before Buckner could surrender to Grant. Forrest inquired of Floyd about Pillow's whereabouts and was told he had already retreated and Forrest was free to follow his own course.

Some historians have judged Ulysses S. Grant as being too rash in his haste to assault Fort Donelson without possessing overwhelming superiority. However, his acquaintance with Gideon Pillow played a key factor in his confidence. As he wrote in his memoirs,

Grant also recalled that, following the surrender of Fort Donelson, he met with his old friend Buckner, who told him of Pillow's escape. At the Confederate council of war the night before, the vain Pillow had expressed concern that his capture would be a disaster for the Southern cause.

"He thought you'd rather get hold of him than any other man in the Southern Confederacy," Buckner told Grant.

"Oh," replied Grant, "if I had got him, I'd let him go again. He will do us more good commanding you fellows."

Suspension and later commands
Pillow assumed command of the 3rd Division of the Army of Central Kentucky, but was suspended from command by order of Jefferson Davis on April 16 for "grave errors in judgement in the military operations which resulted in the surrender of the army" (at Fort Donelson). Pillow resigned October 21, 1862 but Confederate President Jefferson Davis rescinded the resignation and restored Pillow to command on December 10, 1862.

Pillow commanded a brigade in Major General John C. Breckinridge's division of the Army of Tennessee, commanded by General Braxton Bragg, during the third day at the Battle of Stones River, January 2, 1863, arriving on the battlefield just an hour before Breckinridge's assault. Breckinridge was furious to find Pillow cowering behind a tree and ordered him forward. After the battle, Pillow was one of the few Confederate officers to speak in favor of General Bragg's battlefield decisions, denigrating Breckinridge's execution of the ill-fated assault.

Pillow commanded the Volunteer and Conscription Bureau of the Army of Tennessee and related recruiting assignments starting January 16, 1863. Although he had no combat assignments after Stones River, he had a short and unsuccessful field command in June 1864 when he was assigned to disrupt Major General William Tecumseh Sherman's communications between Chattanooga, Tennessee and Atlanta, Georgia during the Atlanta Campaign. He then resumed recruiting assignments.

Pillow was the Commissary General of Prisoners for the Confederacy starting February 10, 1865 after the death of Brigadier General John H. Winder on February 7, 1865. He was captured by Union forces at Union Springs, Alabama, on April 20, 1865, and was paroled in Montgomery, Alabama, in May. He received a presidential pardon on August 28, 1865.

Fort Pillow
Fort Pillow on the Mississippi River in Tennessee, the site of the controversial 1864 Battle of Fort Pillow, was constructed by and named for Pillow.

Postbellum career and death
After the war, Pillow was forced into bankruptcy, but embarked on a successful law practice in Memphis, Tennessee, as partner with former Governor Isham G. Harris. He died October 8, 1878 at age 72 near Helena, Arkansas in Phillips County.

Initially buried at Helena, he was reinterred in Elmwood Cemetery, Memphis.

See also

 List of American Civil War generals (Confederate)
List of people pardoned or granted clemency by the president of the United States

Notes

References
 Bearss, Ed C. "Pillow, Gideon Johnson." In Historical Times Illustrated History of the Civil War, edited by Patricia L. Faust. New York: Harper & Row, 1986. . p. 585.
 Borneman, Walter R. Polk: The Man Who Transformed the Presidency and America. New York: Random House, 2008. .
 Brands, H. W. The Man Who Saved the Union: Ulysses Grant in War and Peace. New York: Anchor Books, a Division of Random House, 2012. .
 Cheathem, Mark R. "Pillow, Gideon Johnson". In Encyclopedia of the American Civil War: A Political, Social, and Military History, edited by David S. Heidler and Jeanne T. Heidler. New York: W. W. Norton & Company, 2000. . pp. 1523–1524.
 Cooling, Benjamin Franklin. Forts Henry and Donelson: The Key to the Confederate Heartland. Knoxville: University of Tennessee Press, 1987. .
 Cozzens, Peter. No Better Place to Die: The Battle of Stones River. Urbana: University of Illinois Press, 1990. .
 Eicher, David J. The Longest Night: A Military History of the Civil War. New York: Simon & Schuster, 2001. .
 Eicher, John H., and David J. Eicher, Civil War High Commands. Stanford: Stanford University Press, 2001. .
 Eisenhower, John S. D. Agent of Destiny: The Life and Times of General Winfield Scott. New York: Free Press, 1997. .
 Gott, Kendall D. Where the South Lost the War: An Analysis of the Fort Henry-Fort Donelson Campaign, February 1862. Mechanicsburg, PA: Stackpole Books, 2011. . Originally published 2003.
 Hamilton, James. The Battle of Fort Donelson. South Brunswick, NJ: T. Yoseloff, 1968. .
 Hughes, Nathaniel Cheairs, Jr. The Battle of Belmont: Grant Strikes South. Chapel Hill: University of North Carolina Press, 1991. .
 Hughes, Nathaniel Cheairs and Roy P. Stonesifer. 1993. The Life and Wars of Gideon J. Pillow. University of North Carolina Press. 
 Hurst, Jack. Men of Fire: Grant, Forrest, and the Campaign That Decided the Civil War. New York: Basic Books, 2007. .
 Johnson, Timothy D. Winfield Scott: The Quest for Military Glory. Lawrence, KS: University Press of Kansas, 1998. .
 Longacre, Edward G. General Ulysses S. Grant: The Soldier and the Man. Cambridge, MA: Da Capo Press, 2006. .
 Sifakis, Stewart. Who Was Who in the Civil War. New York: Facts On File, 1988. .
 Tap, Bruce. Fort Pillow Massacre (12 April 1864). In Encyclopedia of the American Civil War: A Political, Social, and Military History, edited by David S. Heidler and Jeanne T. Heidler. New York: W. W. Norton & Company, 2000. . pp. 746–748.
 Warner, Ezra J. Generals in Gray: Lives of the Confederate Commanders. Baton Rouge: Louisiana State University Press, 1959. .
Hughes, Nathaniel Cheairs and Roy P. Stonesifer. 1993. The Life and Wars of Gideon J. Pillow. University of North Carolina Press.

External links

 

1806 births
1878 deaths
United States Army generals
Confederate States Army brigadier generals
American military personnel of the Mexican–American War
People of Tennessee in the American Civil War
Confederate militia generals
American militia generals
People from Williamson County, Tennessee
University of Nashville alumni
Tennessee lawyers
19th-century American lawyers